Nina Jane Easton (born October 27, 1958) is an American author, journalist, TV commentator, entrepreneur, and film producer. In 2016, she co-founded SellersEaston Media, a private-client storytelling service that chronicles the legacies and impact of leaders in business, public service, and philanthropy. A former senior editor and award-winning columnist for Fortune Magazine, she chaired Fortune Most Powerful Women International, with live events in Asia, Europe, Canada, and the U.S., and she co-chaired the Fortune Global Forum, bringing together top business and government leaders from around the world. At the Center for Strategic and International Studies (CSIS), she founded and hosts a live event series on global affairs called "Smart Women Smart Power." She is a frequent political analyst on television and was a 2012 fellow at the John F. Kennedy School of Government at Harvard University.

Early life

Nina Easton was born in Sudbury, Massachusetts, the daughter of James Easton, an aerospace engineer, and Janet Easton, a homemaker. She grew up in Rancho Palos Verdes, California and attended Miraleste High School. Her journalism career began at Colorado State University, Fort Collins, where she worked as a copy editor and reporter on the college newspaper and authored a front-page feature story for the Denver Post at age 19. After transferring to the University of California, Berkeley, she joined the staff of the Daily Californian, rising from reporter to international page editor and finally to managing editor. In a 2000 C-Span interview Easton stated: "I just started writing for the school paper and it never left my blood."

Career

Journalism
Nina Easton started her career in journalism in 1981 as a writer for Ralph Nader, for whom she co-authored a book on the Reagan Administration. In 1984 she became a staff reporter for the Washington D.C.-based Legal Times. She then wrote for The American Banker and Businessweek before joining the Los Angeles Times as a staff writer, a position she held from 1988 to 1998. Easton's writing for the Los Angeles Times earned her a National Headliner Award in 1994 for best magazine writing and a Sunday Magazine Editors Award for investigative reporting.

In 2003, Easton joined The Boston Globe as the deputy bureau chief at the paper's Washington bureau. From 2006 until 2016, she was a senior editor covering politics and economics for Fortune Magazine.  In 2014, her Fortune column was honored with a National Headliner Award for magazine commentary. Easton also serves as chair of Fortune Magazine's Most Powerful Women International, which hosts events in the United States as well as internationally. She is co-chair of the Fortune Global Forum, which in 2016 brought CEOs to the Vatican to meet Pope Francis and discuss a private-sector compact on creating a more inclusive global economy.

For more than a decade, from 2005 through 2016, Easton was a regular panelist on Fox News Sunday and Special Report with Bret Baier, among other Fox news shows. She has also contributed commentary to NBC's Meet the Press, CBS's Face the Nation, ABC's This Week and PBS programs including The Charlie Rose Show. During the 2004 elections she was an analyst on CNN and during the 2008 campaign she provided primetime election commentary for Fox News.

Recognition and Harvard fellowships
In 1991, Easton was named a "rising star" by the British-American Project, a collaborative project between the School of Advanced International Studies at Johns Hopkins University and the Royal Institute of International Affairs. In 1995 she co-chaired the organization's annual conference in England.

Easton's 2002 book, Gang of Five: Leaders at the Center of the Conservative Ascendancy, which chronicles the rise of post-Reagan conservatism, now ranks on the Vox list of "books to read to understand the world."

In spring 2012, Easton was named a Goldsmith Fellow at Harvard University's Joan Shorenstein Center on the Press, Politics and Public Policy. Easton's announced research project focused on the increasing income inequality in the United States and its impact on Americans' views of the wealthy. Also in 2012, she was named a fellow at Harvard's Institute of Politics where her responsibilities include leading a study group for the Harvard community focusing on role the economy plays in the election cycle.

Publications
Easton is the author of several books. In 1982, Easton co-authored Reagan's Ruling Class: Portraits of the President's Top 100 Officials with Ronald Brownstein. The book, whose preface was written by Ralph Nader, profiled  individuals involved in Ronald Reagan's presidency and included interviews with most of the administration's top officials.

Easton's 2002 book, Gang of Five: Leaders at the Center of the Conservative Ascendancy, examined the rise of modern conservatism and what Easton called the "hidden history" of the baby-boom generation. Gang of Five profiled five leaders of the conservative movement in America: William Kristol, Grover Norquist, David M. McIntosh, Clint Bolick and Ralph Reed.

While working for The Boston Globe, Easton co-authored John F. Kerry: A Complete Biography by The Boston Globe Reporters Who Know Him Best, with fellow Globe reporters Michael Kranish and Brian Mooney. The book was published in 2004, during Massachusetts Senator John Kerry's presidential campaign.

Personal life
Easton grew up in California and graduated Phi Beta Kappa from the University of California, Berkeley. In 1983, Easton was married to Ronald Brownstein; they had two children before divorcing. On November 27, 2004 she married Russell Schriefer, a Republican political strategist who was the senior advisor to the 2012 presidential campaign of Mitt Romney. In May 2007, Washington Monthly named Easton and Schriefer to its list of Washington "power couples". They live with their daughter in Chevy Chase, Maryland.

Bibliography
 Reagan's Ruling Class: Portraits of the President's Top 100 Officials, Pantheon, 1982, co-authored with Ronald Brownstein
 Gang of Five: Leaders at the Center of the Conservative Ascendancy, Simon & Schuster, 2002
 John F. Kerry: The Complete Biography by The Boston Globe Reporters Who Know Him Best, PublicAffairs, 2004, co-authored with Michael Kranish and Brian Mooney

References

External links
 

American biographers
American political commentators
American columnists
American women columnists
American political writers
American political journalists
Place of birth missing (living people)
Fortune (magazine) people
Living people
University of California, Berkeley alumni
Harvard Institute of Politics
1958 births
American women biographers
21st-century American women